Fatal Termination (also known as Death Blow, original title Chi se da feng bao) is a 1990 Hong Kong action film starring Moon Lee and Robin Shou.

Plot
A Hong Kong cop's wife seeks revenge after the abduction of her daughter by a ruthless munitions dealer.

See also
Cinema of Hong Kong

References

External links 

1990 films
Hong Kong action films
Films set in the 1990s
Films shot in Hong Kong
1990s Cantonese-language films
1990 action films
1990s Hong Kong films